Henry Warner (1854 – 1929) was a Trinidadian cricketer. He played in one first-class match for Trinidad and Tobago in 1876/77.

See also
 List of Trinidadian representative cricketers

References

External links
 

1854 births
1929 deaths
Trinidad and Tobago cricketers